Enrique Martínez Celaya (born June 9, 1964) is a contemporary Cuban-born painter, sculptor, author and former scientist whose work has been exhibited and collected by major institutions around the world. He trained and worked as a physicist, completing all coursework for his doctorate, before devoting himself full-time to his artwork. He holds master's degrees in physics and fine arts and has authored books on art and philosophy as well as scientific articles. He is currently a Montgomery Fellow at Dartmouth College, and the Provost Professor of Humanities and Arts at USC.

Early life and education 
Martínez Celaya was born on June 9, 1964, in Havana, Cuba, and spent his early childhood in Nueva Paz and Los Palos, Cuba. His family relocated to Madrid, Spain in 1972. While there, he took up drawing at the age of eight. In 1975, the family relocated again, this time to Puerto Rico. He initiated his formal training as an apprentice to a painter at the age of 12 and developed his early interest in writing and philosophy.

In 1982 he enrolled at Cornell University. He graduated magna cum laude with a Bachelor of Science in Applied Physics and a minor in Electrical Engineering in 1986. He was selected as a Regent's Fellow at the University of California, Berkeley, and earned a Master of Science degree with a specialization in Quantum Electronics While there, he patented several laser devices. He later enrolled in the M.F.A. program at the University of California, Santa Barbara and graduated with highest honors in 1994.  After graduation, he attended the Skowhegan School of Painting and Sculpture in Maine.

Work 

About his interest in literature, Martínez Celaya states, “Reading is a primary source for my work." I read philosophy and literature and that is the universe I see my work in, even though I'm a visual artist. ... Often when artists talk about writers, they're talking about them as source of content. I'm reading them for a moral stance in the world.”

From 2007-2009, Martínez Celaya wrote a blog on his website with a selection of entries published as The Blog: Bad Time for Poetry (Whale & Star, 2010). Since 2012, the blog has continued in the form of journal entries on the artist's personal website. The University of Nebraska Press published a twenty-year survey of his writings in 2011, entitled Collected Writings and Interviews, 1990-2010, which was more recently followed by a second volume, Collected Writings and Interviews, 2010-2017. Martínez Celaya published a selection of lecture notes from his popular workshops, entitled On Art and Mindfulness: Notes from the Anderson Ranch (Whale & Star, 2015), in collaboration with the Anderson Ranch Art Center in Snowmass, Colorado. Martínez Celaya founded Whale and Star in 1998, an imprint that specializes in art and its relationship to other intellectual and creative fields, especially literature, philosophy, and critical theory.

Academic positions 
Martínez Celaya is currently Provost Professor of Humanities and Arts at USC (2017–present) in Los Angeles and a Montgomery Fellow at Dartmouth College (2014–present). He was the Roth Family Distinguished Visiting Scholar at Dartmouth (2016-2017). He was Visiting Presidential Professor in the history of art at University of Nebraska (2007–2010), and an assistant professor of art at Pomona College and the Claremont Graduate University, (1993-2003).

In 2010, Martínez Celaya inaugurated The Lecture Project, funded with assistance from the Knight Foundation. The original programming presented lectures from academics and art critics until late 2012. In 2019, in collaboration with USC Dornsife The Lecture Project was re-launched and is currently hosting programming from Martínez Celaya's Los Angeles Studio.

Awards 
Martínez Celaya was awarded the Brookhaven National Laboratory Fellowship (1986–1988), and was Interdisciplinary Humanities Fellow and Regents Fellow from the University of California (1992–94).  He received Los Angeles County Museum of Art's Young Talent Award (1998), the Hirsch Grant (2002), the Rosa Blanca Award from the Cuban Community (2002), and the California Community Foundation Fellowship, Getty Foundation Award (2004). He was honored with the Inaugural Colorado Contemporary Arts Collaborative Artist Residency at the CU Art Museum, sponsored by Kent and Vicki Logan (2004), and received the Anderson Ranch Arts Center's National Artist Award (2007). In 2020, Martínez Celaya was awarded a Doctor Honoris Causa from Otis College of Art and Design. He was invited to give the college's commencement address the same year, and in 2021 joined the Otis College Board of Governors.

Personal life 
Martínez Celaya married Alexandra Williams, the daughter of American journalist Christian Williams, in 1999. They have four children together. They later divorced in 2015.

Martínez Celaya lives and works in Los Angeles, California.

References

External links 

 

Cuban artists
American male writers
Cornell University College of Engineering alumni
Living people
1964 births
Cuban emigrants to the United States
University of California, Santa Barbara alumni
American contemporary artists
Skowhegan School of Painting and Sculpture alumni
Pomona College faculty